The 2020–21 Belgian Division 2 was the fifth season of the division in its current format, placed at the fourth-tier of football in Belgium and the first under this name, after being renamed (Belgian) Division 2 from (Belgian) Second Amateur Division. The season was cancelled in January 2021 with just a few matches played, as measures taken by the Belgian government against the spread of COVID-19 prohibited amateur football.

The division consisted of three separate leagues. Leagues VFV A and VFV B consist of teams with a license from the Voetbalfederatie Vlaanderen (VFV, the Flemish/Dutch speaking wing of the Belgian FA) and contain 16 teams, while the ACFF league contains teams with a license from the Association des Clubs Francophones de Football (ACFF, the French-speaking wing of the RBFA) and contains 17 teams. The champions from each of the three leagues would normally have been promoted to the 2021–22 Belgian National Division 1, but due to the cancellation no teams were promoted or relegated.

Team changes

In
 Tubize after finishing in the relegation zone in the 2019–20 Belgian First Amateur Division.
 Zelzate was promoted after winning the 2019–20 Belgian Third Amateur Division A.
 Lyra-Lierse was promoted after winning the 2019–20 Belgian Third Amateur Division B.
 Ganshoren was promoted after winning the 2019–20 Belgian Third Amateur Division C.
 Warnant was promoted after winning the 2019–20 Belgian Third Amateur Division D.
 As no promotion play-offs could be held due to the 2019–20 season ending prematurely due to the COVID-19 pandemic in Belgium, Ninove, Brakel, Wetteren, City Pirates, Heur-Tongeren, Houtvenne and Jette were all promoted based on their finishing position.
 Virton were refused both a professional football license and a remunerated football license, meaning they were relegated two levels, coming in directly from the 2019–20 Belgian First Division B.

Out
 Knokke was promoted after winning the 2019–20 Belgian Second Amateur Division A.
 Tienen was promoted after winning the 2019–20 Belgian Second Amateur Division B.
 Francs Borains was promoted after winning the 2019–20 Belgian Second Amateur Division C.
 Hamme, Sint-Niklaas, Namur FLV and Onhaye were all relegated after finishing in the relegation positions the previous season.
 Duffel did not complete the previous season due to financial difficulties and was hence automatically relegated.
 Vosselaar and Tilleur decided not to apply for a football license, while Geel did apply for a license but wasn't awarded one, resulting in all three teams being relegated.

Merger
 Temse merged with Lokeren to become K.S.C. Lokeren-Temse, known as Lokeren-Temse. Strictly speaking, the new club is a continuation of Temse rather than Lokeren, as the latter club has been dissolved.

Belgian Division 2 VFV A

League table

Belgian Division 2 VFV B

League table

Belgian Division 2 ACFF

League table

Number of teams by provinces

References

Belgian Second Amateur Division
Bel
4
Bel